Ir. Tang Heap Seng (born ) is a Malaysian. He is a veteran Malaysian Chinese Association (MCA) leader for the Air Putih constituency of Penang. Tang contested the Bayan Baru parliamentary seat in the 2013 general election representing Barisan Nasional but lost to the Parti Keadilan Rakyat (PKR) candidate, Sim Tze Tzin with a majority of a 19,307. In the 2018 general election, he contested the Penang state constituency of Air Putih but lost to Lim Guan Eng from Democratic Action Party (DAP) in a four-corner fight.

Education
Tang studied engineering in University Malaya, he graduated with honors in 1982.

Awards
For his valor in community service and charity works, Tang was awarded the Meritorious Service Medal from the Pulau Pinang government.

Service to the community
 Tang was the one who suggested that walkie-talkie must be provided to the local community policing squad in order to be an effective force in deterring crime in housing and business area. To date, 9 walkie-talkies was given to a squad of 60 members.

Election results

References

1957 births
Living people
People from Penang
Malaysian people of Chinese descent
Malaysian civil engineers
Malaysian Chinese Association politicians
21st-century Malaysian politicians
Malaysian people of Teochew descent